Strumigenys formosensis is a species of ant endemic to Taiwan. It is widely distributed within the island at low and middle elevations.

It can be distinguished from other Strumigenys ants found on Taiwan by the sickle-shaped mandibles, clypeus with concave anterior margin and numerous short, broad hairs on the head.

References

Myrmicinae
Insects described in 1912
Endemic fauna of Taiwan
Insects of Taiwan
Hymenoptera of Asia